Hampstead is a town in Carroll County in the U.S. state of Maryland. The population was 6,323 at the 2010 census.

History

Between 1736 and 1738, Robert Owings was assigned to "cut a new road as Christopher Gist had marked it" south from Conewago (now Hanover, Pennsylvania) to a point about halfway to Fort Garrison in Baltimore County. The village of Spring Garden became a stage-line stop on the new road and later became the town of Hampstead, named after Hampstead, in England. The first European settlers to the area were English immigrants who made their way west from the Port of Philadelphia. They were followed by Scots and Germans. Hampstead was used by farmers from surrounding areas as a center to obtain goods brought from Baltimore and to send produce to markets in Baltimore and Pennsylvania.  The level and fertile land, coupled with the availability of lime, gave farmers important advantages for successful farming.  In 1879, the Harrisburg Division of the Western Maryland Railroad reached Hampstead. The accessibility of the railroad attracted new residents and made dairy farming profitable.  The town was incorporated in 1888 and since then has developed from a farming community to a modern town of about 6,300 residents. 

Hampstead School was listed on the National Register of Historic Places in 2002. Once defunct and derelict, it was rehabilitated and is now The Residences at Hampstead School, a retirement facility.

Geography
Hampstead is located at  (39.610303, -76.851493).

Demographics

2010 census
As of the census of 2010, there were 6,323 people, 2,415 households, and 1,658 families living in the town. The racial makeup of the town was 94.0% White, 2.0% African American, 0.3% Native American, 1.4% Asian, 0.9% from other races, and 1.5% from two or more races. Hispanic or Latino of any race were 3.0% of the population.

There were 2,415 households, of which 42.5% had children under the age of 18 living with them, 52.8% were married couples living together, 11.4% had a female householder with no husband present, 4.5% had a male householder with no wife present, and 31.3% were non-families. 26.7% of all households were made up of individuals, and 11.1% had someone living alone who was 65 years of age or older. The average household size was 2.62 and the average family size was 3.20.

The median age in the town was 35.2 years. 28.4% of residents were under the age of 18; 7.7% were between the ages of 18 and 24; 30.1% were from 25 to 44; 23.9% were from 45 to 64; and 9.8% were 65 years of age or older. The gender makeup of the town was 47.3% male and 52.7% female.

2000 census
As of the census of 2000, there were 5,060 people, 1,787 households, and 1,327 families living in the town. The racial makeup of the town was 97.79% White, 0.79% African American, 0.06% Native American, 0.51% Asian, 0.06% from other races, and 0.79% from two or more races. Hispanic or Latino of any race were 1.09% of the population.

There were 1,787 households, out of which 50.7% had children under the age of 18 living with them, 59.3% were married couples living together, 11.4% had a female householder with no husband present, and 25.7% were non-families. 21.6% of all households were made up of individuals, and 6.7% had someone living alone who was 65 years of age or older. The average household size was 2.83 and the average family size was 3.32.

In the town, the population was spread out, with 34.7% under the age of 18, 5.8% from 18 to 24, 39.5% from 25 to 44, 14.2% from 45 to 64, and 5.8% who were 65 years of age or older. The median age was 31 years. For every 100 females, there were 94.3 males. For every 100 females age 18 and over, there were 88.0 males.

The median income for a household in the town was $56,655, and the median income for a family was $62,460. Males had a median income of $45,000 versus $30,407 for females. The per capita income for the town was $22,730. About 1.3% of families and 2.4% of the population were below the poverty line, including 1.5% of those under age 18 and 6.4% of those age 65 or over.

Education
The main schools In Hampstead are North Carroll Middle School, Shiloh Middle School, Spring Garden Elementary School and Hampstead Elementary School, which also service other towns and unincorporated areas nearby.

Transportation

The primary means of travel to and from Hampstead is by road. Maryland Route 30 is the most prominent highway serving the town. Formerly passing directly through the center of town, MD 30 now follows a bypass on the west side of Hampstead, with the original alignment now designated Maryland Route 30 Business. MD 30 provides connections northward to Manchester and southward to Reisterstown. Other highways serving Hampstead include Maryland Route 88, Maryland Route 482 and Maryland Route 833.

The Owings Mills station of the Baltimore Metro SubwayLink in nearby Owings Mills, Baltimore County, is a 20 minute drive by car from Hampstead and provides subway access to downtown Baltimore.

References

External links

 Town of Hampstead official website
 Statistical data

 
Towns in Maryland
Towns in Carroll County, Maryland